The 2019 West Coast Conference men's basketball tournament was the postseason men's basketball tournament for the West Coast Conference during the 2018–19 NCAA Division I men's basketball season, held March 7–12 at the Orleans Arena in Paradise, Nevada. Saint Mary's upset top-ranked Gonzaga 60–47 in the championship game and received the conference's automatic bid to the 68-team NCAA tournament.

It was the fourth WCC tournament title for Saint Mary's, their first since 2012, and the Gaels were seeded eleventh in the South regional of the NCAA Tournament. With the loss, Gonzaga fell to fourth in the national rankings, but was still the top seed in the West regional.

Seeds
All ten WCC schools teams participated in the tournament, seeded by conference record, with a tiebreaker system for identical conference records. The tournament returned to a format similar to that used from 2003 to 2011, with slight changes to the terminology used for the rounds prior to the semifinals. The 7 through 10 seeds will play in the "first round", the 5 and 6 seeds will start play in the "second round", and the 3 and 4 seeds will start in the "third round". The top two seeds will receive byes into the semifinals. 

As the regular-season champion, Gonzaga clinched a semifinal spot, and technically secured a place in the NIT. However, the Bulldogs were all but certain to receive an NCAA Tournament bid regardless of results in the conference tournament, given that they entered the final week of the conference season as the top-ranked team in the AP poll.

Saint Mary's also clinched a semifinal berth as the regular season runner-up. BYU and San Francisco clinched double byes, while LMU and Santa Clara had single byes. San Diego, Pepperdine, Pacific and Portland played in the first round.

Schedule

Bracket

References

Tournament
West Coast Conference men's basketball tournament
West Coast Athletic Conference men's basketball tournament
West Coast Athletic Conference men's basketball tournament
Basketball competitions in the Las Vegas Valley
College basketball tournaments in Nevada
College sports tournaments in Nevada